Unilorin FM is a radio station operated by the University of Ilorin, in Kwara State, Nigeria. The radio station operates on the 89.3 MHz frequency.
The radio station started operations on August 13, 2009. The radio station provides informative, educative and entertaining programs.

References

External links

Radio stations established in 2009
Radio stations in Nigeria
2009 establishments in Nigeria